The Black Scorpion is a retired professional wrestling gimmick in World Championship Wrestling in 1990 that was played by a variety of wrestlers. The character had a feud with Sting which lasted from fall to winter that year.

History
In August 1990, The Black Scorpion debuted in WCW (which was still under the NWA banner at the time) in vignettes taunting NWA World Heavyweight Champion Sting. He wore a hooded robe to conceal his face and warned Sting he was after him. The wrestler playing this part was Ole Anderson with his voice distorted enough to keep the fans pondering his identity. The announcers and parties involved attempted to imply that The Scorpion was a former friend of Sting, with the main suspects being former tag partner Jim Hellwig (a.k.a. The Ultimate Warrior, who was the WWF Champion at the time), or former training and Powerteam USA partner Dave Sheldon aka The Angel of Death.

The Black Scorpion debuted in the ring against Sting for his title at Clash of the Champions XII on September 5, 1990. The wrestler playing him this time was Al Perez, who, according to Ric Flair, was supposed to remain The Black Scorpion until his unmasking—that is, before he quit. Sting was about to unmask him when another Black Scorpion appeared on the entrance ramp, allowing the one that wrestled to escape. The Scorpion would also incorporate amateur "magic" into his taunting of Sting by performing parlor tricks with members of the audience, presumably plants. According to one wrestling website, magician Franz Harary performed the illusions.

Sting wrestled Black Scorpion at house shows but could never unmask him because of continuous attacks by Sid Vicious. The performers Sting faced at these house shows were either Jeff Ellis or The Angel of Death. The Black Scorpion gimmick was cut short by an accident in training when Anderson's arm was broken. 

Eventually, a rematch was signed between Sting and the Black Scorpion for Starrcade. It was to be a cage match with professional wrestling legend Dick the Bruiser as the special guest referee. The rule was if the Black Scorpion did not win the title, he would be forced to reveal his identity. Sting defeated the Black Scorpion with a flying shoulder tackle off the top rope. The Scorpion was unmasked to reveal Ric Flair. According to Flair, it would have been either himself or Barry Windham. Flair volunteered thinking the gimmick wouldn't hurt him, whereas it could Windham, who recently portrayed an imposter Sting at Halloween Havoc on October 27. The Black Scorpion angle ended with Flair's unmasking. Flair, as himself, ended up winning the title from Sting at a WCW house show less than a month later.

See also
The Four Horsemen

References

External links
OnlineWorldofWrestling.com - Wrestler Profiles: "Nature Boy" Ric Flair

Professional wrestling gimmicks
1990 in professional wrestling
World Championship Wrestling